Laurent Bonnart (born 25 December 1979) is a French retired footballer who played as a full-back.

Career
Born in Chambray-lès-Tours, Bonnart began his career with Le Mans UC72, he became a regular in the team from the start of the 2001–02 season, having made his debut in Ligue 2 in the season's first match.

In 2007, he moved from Le Mans to Marseille.

In 2010, he moved to Monaco on a free transfer.

Honours
Marseille
Ligue 1: 2009–10
Coupe de la Ligue: 2009–10

References

External links
Profile at L'Équipe
Career Stats at lfp.fr

1979 births
Living people
People from Chambray-lès-Tours
French footballers
Sportspeople from Indre-et-Loire
Association football defenders
Tours FC players
Le Mans FC players
Olympique de Marseille players
AS Monaco FC players
Lille OSC players
AC Ajaccio players
Ligue 1 players
Ligue 2 players
Footballers from Centre-Val de Loire